Sugia is a genus of moths of the family Noctuidae. The genus was described by Ueda in 1984.

Species
Sugia elaeostygia (Sugi, 1982) Japan
Sugia idiostygia (Sugi, 1958) Japan
Sugia rufa Ueda, 1987 Taiwan
Sugia stygia (Butler, 1878) Korea, Japan
Sugia stygiodes (Sugi, 1958) Japan, Taiwan

References

Acontiinae